Juan que reía is a 1976 Argentine film.

Cast
Luis Brandoni, Ana María Campoy, Enrique Pinti, Luisina Brando, Federico Luppi, Gianni Lunadei

External links
 

1976 films
Argentine comedy-drama films
1970s Spanish-language films
Films directed by Carlos Galettini
1970s Argentine films